Pariva Pranati is an Indian actress who mainly appears in Hindi soap operas. She has acted inVaada Raha, With Love, Delhi. Most recently, she was playing Amrita in the series Hamari Sister Didi. She is currently starring as Vandana Wagle in Wagle Ki Duniya – Nayi Peedhi Naye Kissey on Sony SAB.

Personal life
Pariva was born as Pariva Sinha in Patna in a Bihari Hindu family. Her father Prabhat Sinha is a Retired Air Force Officer. She is an alumnus of Air Force Golden Jubilee Institute and Lady Shree Ram College in Delhi. Pariva now resides in Mumbai. 

Pariva married actor and wildlife photographer Puneet Sachdev at a private ceremony in Gwalior on Valentine's Day (14 February 2014). The couple had a baby boy on 9 May 2017.

Filmography

Films

 2009 Vaada Raha1234 as Rosy
 2011 With Love, Delhi! as Priyanka Khanna

Television

Awards and nominations

See also
 Air Force Golden Jubilee Institute alumni

References

External links
 
 
 Pariva Pranati biography at apnicommunity

Living people
1983 births
Actresses from Patna
Indian film actresses
People from Bihar
Indian television actresses
Indian soap opera actresses
Actresses in Hindi television
Actresses in Hindi cinema
21st-century Indian actresses